The 12 Cellists of the Berlin Philharmonic are an all-cello ensemble featuring the cellists of the Berlin Philharmonic.

Current members
The group consists of the fourteen cellists of the Berlin Philharmonic, with twelve performing at any given time.

Bruno Delepelaire, principal
Martin Löhr, principal
Olaf Maninger, principal
Ludwig Quandt, principal
Richard Duven
Rachel Helleur
Christoph Igelbrink
Solène Kermarrec
Stephan Koncz
Martin Menking
David Riniker
Nikolaus Römisch
Dietmar Schwalke
Knut Weber

Recordings
South American Getaway (CD, EMI 2000)
Round Midnight (CD, EMI 2002)
As time goes by (CD, EMI 2004)
Angel Dances (CD, EMI  2006)
Fleur de Paris (CD, EMI 2010)
Die 12 Cellisten: Anniversary concert 40 years & documentary film (DVD, Euroarts 2012)
Hora Cero (CD, Sony CLASSICAL 2016)

References

External links
Official website
Berlin Philharmonic page about the group

Musical groups from Berlin
German classical cellists
Berlin Philharmonic
Musical groups established in 1972
Chamber music groups
1972 establishments in Germany